Sleepless Nights is a 2003 Egyptian drama film directed by Hani Khalifa.

Cast 
 Mona Zaki - Perry
 Hanan Tork - Farah
 Sherif Mounir - Sameh
 Fathy Abdel Wahab - Khaled
 Khaled Abol Naga - Ali
 Ahmed Helmy - Amr
 Ola Ghanem - Inas
 Gihan Fadel - Moshira

References

External links 

2003 drama films
2003 films
Egyptian drama films